The members of the 34th Manitoba Legislature were elected in the Manitoba general election held in April 1988. The legislature sat from July 21, 1988, to August 7, 1990.

The Progressive Conservative Party led by Gary Filmon formed the government.

Sharon Carstairs of the Liberal Party was Leader of the Opposition.

Denis Rocan served as speaker for the assembly.

Native leader Elijah Harper blocked the introduction of the motion to ratify the Meech Lake Accord and so the Accord was not approved by the June 23, 1990, deadline.

Following the failure of the Accord, Premier Filmon called a snap election in September 1990 to take advantage of an increase in his popularity because he was now perceived as a strong defender of Manitoba's interests.

There were two sessions of the 34th Legislature:

George Johnson was Lieutenant Governor of Manitoba.

Members of the Assembly 
The following members were elected to the assembly in 1988:

Notes:

By-elections 
None

References 

Terms of the Manitoba Legislature
1988 establishments in Manitoba
1990 disestablishments in Manitoba